Sirens (Remixes) is a remix album by English electronic music production duo Gorgon City. The album features remixes of the singles from their debut album Sirens. It also includes two Gorgon City remixed singles: "Hideaway" by Kiesza and "Say You Love Me" by Jessie Ware. It was released on 7 April 2015 in the UK.

Track listing

References

2015 remix albums